The New Jewish School (Russian: Новая еврейская школа (НЕШ)) was a movement in Russia of the 1900s to create a national Jewish art music. It was connected with the founding of the Society for Jewish Folk Music.

Selected discography
 Eli Zion - from St. Petersburg to Jerusalem - Music from the "New Jewish School" : Joseph Achron: Fragment mystique. Ernest Bloch: Méditation hébraïque. From Jewish Life. Sinowi Feldman Poem. Solomon Rosowsky: Rhapsodie - Récitatif et Danse Hassidique. Lazare Saminsky: Chassidic Suite: Chassidic Dance. Chassidic Suite: Meditation. Joachim Stutschewsky: Frejlachs. Shir Yehudi. Israeli Suite. Leo Zeitlin: Eli Zion - paraphrase on a folk theme and trope of 'Song of Songs'. Performed by David Geringas (cello) and Jascha Nemtsov (piano). recording SWR. released Hänssler Classic.

References

Composition schools
Jewish music
Music organizations based in Russia
Jewish organizations based in Russia